Lake Fork Creek is a  river in Hunt, Rains, and Wood counties in Texas. It is a major tributary of the Sabine River, and has as its major tributaries Dry Creek, Glade Creek, Caney Creek, Little Caney Creek, Rainwater Creek, and Birch Creek.

In 1980, Lake Fork Creek was impounded, resulting in the formation of Lake Fork Reservoir.

See also
List of rivers of Texas

References

USGS Hydrologic Unit Map - State of Texas (1974)

Rivers of Texas
Rivers of Hunt County, Texas
Rivers of Rains County, Texas
Rivers of Wood County, Texas